Levi is a 2019 Nigerian drama film directed by Okechukwu Oku. It stars Ramsey Nouah, Nancy Isime, Deyemi Okanlawon, Lydia Forson and Bimbo Manuel.

The film tells the story of Levi, who after being diagnosed of a life-threatening medical condition, decides to look for and get his childhood love interest (Somi), so they can finally be together before his death. However, Somi is already married, but Levi will not accept defeat.

Cast
Ramsey Nouah as Levi
Nancy Isime as Somi
Deyemi Okanlawon as
Lydia Forson as
Bimbo Manuel

Awards and nominations

References

English-language Nigerian films
2019 drama films
Nigerian drama films
2010s English-language films